1848 election may refer to:
1848 French presidential election
1848 French Constituent Assembly election
1848 United States presidential election
1848 United States House of Representatives elections